In North America Channel 71 was removed from television use in 1983; it was used by television stations in North America which broadcast on 812-818 MHz. In the United States, channels 70-83 served primarily as a "translator band" containing repeater transmitters to fill gaps in coverage for existing stations:
 WTPA-TV in Harrisburg, Pennsylvania moved from channel 71 to the former DuMont WCMB-TV frequency allocation (channel 27) in 1957. It now operates as WHTM-TV (ABC)
 WHCT-TV in Hartford, Connecticut moved from channel 71 to channel 18 and is now Univisión affiliate WUVN
 KAMR-TV (NBC Amarillo) rebroadcaster K71BK Gruver, Texas moved to K38BU channel 38.
 KATU (ABC Portland) rebroadcaster K71AJ Wasco, Oregon moved to K33CJ channel 33.
 KHQ-TV (NBC Spokane) rebroadcaster K71AQ Milton-Freewater, Oregon moved to K40FM channel 40.
 KIMA-TV (CBS Yakima) rebroadcaster K71AA Ellensburg, Washington was moved to K51BD channel 51.
 KOAA-TV (NBC Pueblo) rebroadcaster K71CB Springfield, Colorado was moved to K64CT channel 64.
 KOIN-TV (CBS Portland) rebroadcaster K71AV Florence, Oregon moved to K60DQ channel 60.
 KTVK (ABC Phoenix) rebroadcasters K71AB Blythe, California  and K71AD/K71CF Flagstaff, Arizona were moved to K24FA channel 24 and K54GI channel 54 respectively.
 KUED-TV (PBS Salt Lake City) rebroadcaster K71BH Milford, Utah moved to K07GY channel 7.
 KUTV (CBS Salt Lake City) rebroadcaster K71BR Price, Utah was moved to K02OT channel 2
 KVAL-TV (CBS Eugene) rebroadcaster K71AG Cottage Grove, Oregon moved to K58CT channel 58.

References 

71